Hewamunaweerage Susila Devi de Silva (born January 30, 1957 as සුසිලා කෝට්ටගේ) [Sinhala]), popularly known as Susila Kottage, is an actress in Sri Lankan cinema theater and television. One of Sri Lanka's best female comedians, Kottage is famous for the role Dayawathi in television serial Kopi Kade and films Angara Dagara and Sikuru Hathe.

Personal life
Susila Kottage was born on 30 January 1957 in Matara. Her mother died at the delivery and her father married another woman when she was young. She completed her education from Sujatha Vidyalaya, Matara. She is married to Rahal Bulathsinhala, who is a retired jail police officer as well as a renowned actor. She met Rahal during stage dramas.

Acting career

Selected television serials

 Bedde Senehasa
 Dangayanta Pamanai 
 Dekada Kada
 Doo Kumariyo
 Eth Kanda Lihini
 Gajamuthu
 Hapanaa
 Hatara Kenderaya
 Hatara Wate
 Hiruta Pipena Sooriyakantha
 Iskole
 Isuru Sangramaya
 Ithin Eeta Passe
 Kasee Salu 
 Kombi
 Kopi Kade as Dayawathi
 Kula Kumariya 
 Mehew Rate
 Miringu Sayura
 On Ataka Nataka
 Pawela Walakule Ewida Amma
 Prarthana Mal
 Rahai Jeewithe
 Ran Poruwa 
 Sabawen Awasarai
 Sakala Guru
 Sakala Guru 2 
 Sanda Hiru Tharu
 Sathyangana 
 Sathyaya 
 Sihina Siththaravi
 Sil 
 Situ Gedara
 Sulang Kapolla 
 Waramal
 Vinoda Samayan
 Visi Eka 
 Yalui Api Yalui

Selected stage dramas

 Sargentge Nandamma
 Nekatha
 Ilndari

Illness
In 2017, she was admitted in the hospital with a heart attack. She underwent treatments for 4 days at the ward 61 in General Hospital, Colombo.

Controversy
In 2010, Kottage has been produced before the Kaduwela District Court on a charge of defamation of Rs. 300,000 from the teledrama director Leela Wickramarachchi. The Additional Magistrate and Additional District Judge Sujatha Alahapperuma, ordered her to appear before the court on September 23, 2010. The incident took place where Kottage has joined as an actress in the teledrama directed by Wickramarachchi Ithin Mata Awasarai.

Filmography
Her maiden cinematic experience came through the 1990 film Saharawe Sihinaya, with a minor role. She has acted in more than 45 films mostly in comedy roles. Some of her popular films are Sikuru Hathe, Angara Dangara and 64 Mayam.

References

External links
 හෘදයාබාධයක් නිසා රෝහල් ගතකෙරුණු සුසිලා
 Susila Kottage videos
 තරු ජෝඩු

Living people
Sri Lankan film actresses
1957 births